A mire is a kind of wetland.

Mire or Miré may also refer to:


Geography
Miré, a commune in France
Mire Loch, a Scottish body of water

People
Merxat or Mire, Chinese actor
Mire Chatman (born 1978), American former professional basketball player 
Mire Hagi Farah Mohamed (1962-2006), Somali politician and government minister
Hassan Ali Mire, Somali politician, former Minister of Education 
Ismail Mire (c. 1862-1950), Somali poet and general
Sada Mire (born 1977), Swedish-Somali archaeologist
Solomon Mire (1989), Zimbabwean cricketer

Other uses
"Mire" (short story), by Anton Chekhov
Mire language, spoken in Chad, Africa
MIRE therapy, acronym for monochromatic infrared light energy, an alternate name for low level laser therapy

See also

Mir (disambiguation)
Myre (disambiguation)

pl:Torfowisko